X6 was a series of three-car electric multiple units operated by Statens Järnvägar (SJ) of Sweden as local trains around Stockholm and Göteborg. Three units were built by Allmänna Svenska Elektriska Aktiebolaget (ASEA) in 1960 and were in service until 1985.

History
The three X6-units were a test batch for SJ based on the X7-series delivered a few years before. They were put into service around Stockholm on the line Märsta–Södertälje. In 1965 it was decided that the landsting of Stockholm, through Storstockholms Lokaltrafik was to operate the Stockholm commuter rail. When the X1-series was delivered, SJ transferred the X6 to the Göteborg area in 1970. They remained in service until 1985 when they were replaced by the X10.

External links
Järnväg.net on X6 

X06
X06
ASEA multiple units